Nuclear decommissioning is the process leading to the irreversible complete or partial closure of a nuclear facility, usually a nuclear reactor, with the ultimate aim at termination of the operating licence. The process usually runs according to a decommissioning plan, including the whole or partial dismantling and decontamination of the facility, ideally resulting in restoration of the environment up to greenfield status. The decommissioning plan is fulfilled when the approved end state of the facility has been reached.

The process typically takes about 15 to 30 years, or many decades more when an interim safe storage periode is applied for radioactive decay. Radioactive waste that remains after the decommissioning is either moved to an on-site storage facility where it is still under control of the owner, or moved to a dry cask storage or disposal facility at another location. The final disposal of nuclear waste from past and future decommissioning is a growing still unsolved problem.

Decommissioning is an administrative and technical process. The facility is dismantled to the point that it no longer requires measures for radiation protection. It includes clean-up of radioactive materials. Once a facility is fully decommissioned, no radiological danger should persist. The license will be terminated and the site released from regulatory control. The plant licensee is then no longer responsible for the nuclear safety.

The costs of decommissioning are to be covered by funds that are provided for in a decommissioning plan, which is part of the facility’s initial authorization. They may be saved in a decommissioning fund, such as a trust fund.

There are worldwide also hundreds of thousands small nuclear devices and facilities, for medical, industrial and research purposes, that will have to be decommissioned at some point.

Definition
Nuclear decommissioning is the administrative and technical process leading to the irreversible closure of a nuclear facility such as a nuclear power plant (NPP), a research reactor, an isotope production plant, a particle accelerator, or uranium mine. It refers to the administrative and technical actions taken to remove all or some of the regulatory controls from the facility to bring about that its site can be reused. Decommissioning includes planning, decontamination, dismantling and materials management.

Decommissioning is the final step in the lifecycle of a nuclear installation. It involves activities from shutdown and removal of nuclear material to the environmental restoration of the site. The term decommissioning covers all measures carried out after a nuclear installation has been granted a decommissioning licence until nuclear regulatory supervision is no longer necessary. The aim is ideally to restore the natural initial state that existed before the construction of the nuclear power plant, the so-called greenfield status.

Decommissioning includes all steps as described in the decommissioning plan, leading to the release of a nuclear facility from regulatory control. The decommissioning plan is fulfilled when the approved end state of the facility has been reached. Disposal facilities for radioactive waste are closed rather than decommissioned. The use of the term decommissioning implies that no further use of the facility (or part thereof) for its existing purpose is foreseen. Though decommissioning typically includes dismantling of the facility, it is not necessarily part of it as far as existing structures are reused after decommissioning and decontamination.,p. 49-50

From the owner's perspective, the ultimate aim of decommissioning is termination of the operating license, once he has given certainty that the radiation at the site is below the legal limits, which in the US is an annual exposure of 25 millirem in case of releasing of the site to the public for unrestricted use. The site will be dismantled to the point that it no longer requires measures for radiation protection. Once a facility is decommissioned no radioactive danger persists and it can be released from regulatory control.

The complete process usually takes about 20 to 30 years. In the US, the decommissioning must be completed within 60 years of the plant ceasing operations, unless a longer time is necessary to protect public health and safety; up to 50 years are for radioactive decay and 10 years to dismantle the facility.

Steps in the decommissioning process 
The decommissioning process encompasses:
pre-decommissioning
 development of a decommissioning plan
 involvement of the public (in democracies)
 application for a decommissioning license
 permanent shutdown
 removal and disposal of nuclear fuel, coolant(s) and/or moderator
decommissioning
 dismantling and decontamination
 in the US, a License Termination Plan (LTP) has to be submitted two years prior to (the expected) termination of the plant license.
 restoration of the environment
 termination of the operating license; turn over responsibilities
 monitoring of the site (in case of deferred dismantling/Safstor)
 monitoring and maintenance of the interim storage of spent fuel
 final disposal of radioactive waste

Decommissioning plan 

Under supervision of the IAEA, a member state first developes a decommissioning plan to demonstrate the feasibility of decommissioning and assure that the associated costs are covered. At the final shutdown, a final decommissioning plan describes in detail how the decommissioning will take place, how the facility will be safely dismantled, ensuring radiation protection of the workers and the public, addressing environmental impacts, managing  radioactive and non-radioactive materials, and termination of the regulatory authorization. In the EU, decommissioning operations are overseen by Euratom. Member states are assisted by the European Commission.

The progressive demolition of buildings and removal of radioactive material is potentially occupationally hazardous, expensive, time-intensive, and presents environmental risks that must be addressed to ensure radioactive materials are either transported elsewhere for storage or stored on-site in a safe manner.

Disposal of nuclear waste 

Radioactive waste that remains after the decommissioning is either moved to an on-site storage facility where it still is under control of the plant owner, or moved to a dry cask storage or disposal facility at another location. The problem of long-term disposal of nuclear waste is still unsolved. Pending the availability of geologic repository sites for long-term disposal, interim storage is necessary. As the planned Yucca Mountain nuclear waste repository – like elsewhere in the world – is controversial, on- or off-site storage in the US usually takes place in Independent Spent Fuel Storage Facilities (ISFSI's).

In the UK, all eleven Magnox reactors are in decommissioning under responsibility of the NDA. The spent fuel was removed and transferred to the Sellafield site in Cumbria for reprocessing. Facilities for "temporay" storage of nuclear waste – mainly 'Intermediate Level Waste' (ILW) – are in the UK called Interim Storage Facilities (ISF's).

Environmental impact assessment 

The decommission of a nuclear reactor can only take place after the appropriate licence has been granted pursuant to the relevant legislation. As part of the licensing procedure, various documents, reports and expert opinions have to be written and delivered to the competent authority, e.g. safety report, technical documents and an environmental impact assessment (EIA). In the European Union these documents are a precondition for granting such a licence is an opinion by the European Commission according to Article 37 of the Euratom Treaty. On the basis of these general data, the Commission must be in a position to assess the exposure of reference groups of the population in the nearest neighbouring states.

Options
There are several options for decommissioning:

Immediate dismantling (DECON in the United States)
Shortly after the permanent shutdown, the dismantling and/or decontamination of the facility begins. Equipment, structures, systems and components that contain radioactive material are removed and/or decontaminated to a level that permits the ending of regulatory control of the facility and its release, either for unrestricted use or with restrictions on its future use.,p. 50 The operating license is terminated.

Deferred dismantling (SAFSTOR in the United States; "care and maintenance" (C&M) in the UK)
The final decommissioning is postponed for a longer period, usually 30 to 50 years. Often the non-nuclear part of the facility is dismantled and the fuel removed immediately. The radioactive part is maintained and monitored in a condition that allows the radioactivity to decay. Afterwards, the plant is dismantled and the property decontaminated to levels that permit release for unrestricted or restrict use. In the US, the decommissioning must be completed within 60 years. With deferred dismantling, costs are shifted to the future, but this entails the risk of rising expenditures for decades to come and changing rules. Moreover, the site cannot be re-used until the decommissioning is finished, while there are no longer revenues from production.

Partial entombment
The US has introduced the so-called In Situ Decommissioning (ISD) closures. All aboveground structures are dismantled; all remaining belowground structures are entombed by grouting all spaces. Advantages are lower decommissioning costs and safer execution. Disadvantages are main components remaining undismantled and definitively inaccessible. The site has to be monitored indefinitely.

This method was implemented at the Savannah River Site in South Carolina for the closure of the P and R Reactors. With this method, the cost of decommissioning for each reactor was about $73 million. In comparison, the decommissioning of each reactor using traditional methods would have been an estimated $250 million. This resulted in a 71% decrease in cost. Other examples are the Hallam nuclear reactor and the Experimental Breeder Reactor II.

Complete entombment
The facility will not be dismantled. Instead it is entombed and maintained indefinitely, and surveillance is continued until the entombed radioactive waste is decayed to a level permitting termination of the license and unrestricted release of the property. The licensee maintains the license previously issued. This option is likely the only possible one in case of a nuclear disaster where the reactor is destroyed and dismantling is impossible or too dangerous. An example of full entombment is the Chernobyl reactor.

In IAEA terms, entombment is not considered an acceptable strategy for decommissioning a facility following a planned permanent shutdown, except under exceptional circumstances, such as a nuclear disaster. In that case, the structure has to be maintained and surveillance continued until the radioactive material is decayed to a level permitting termination of the licence and unrestricted release of the structure.,p. 50

Costs 
The calculation of the total cost of decommissioning is challenging, as there are large differences between countries regarding inclusion of certain costs, such as on-site storage of fuel and radioactive waste from decommissioning, dismanting of non-radioactive buildings and structures, and transport and (final) disposal of radioactive waste.,p.61 

Moreover, estimates of future costs of deferred decommissioning are virtually impossible, due to the long periode, where inflation and rising costs are unpredictable. Nuclear decommissioning projects are characterized by high and highly variable costs, long schedule and a range of risks. Compared with non-nuclear decommissioning, additional costs are usually related with radiological hazards and safety & security requirements, but also with higher wages for requiered higher qualified personal. Benchmarking, comparing projects in different countries, may be useful in estimating the cost of decommissioning. While, for instance, costs for spent fuel and high-level-waste management significantly impacts the budget and schedule of decommissioning projects, it is necessary to clarify which is the starting and the ending point of the decommissioning process.

The effective decommissioning activities begin after all nuclear fuel has been removed from the plant areas that will be decommissioned and these activities form a critical component of pre-decommissioning operations, thus should be factored into the decommissioning plan. The chosen option – immediate or deferred decommissioning – impacts the overall costs. Many other factors also influence the cost. A 2018 KPMG article about decommissioning costs observes that many entities do not include the cost of managing spent nuclear fuel, removed from the plant areas that will be decommissioned (in the US routinely stored in ISFSIs).

In 2004, in a meeting in Vienna, the International Atomic Energy Agency estimated the total cost for the decommissioning of all nuclear facilities.
Decommissioning of all nuclear power reactors in the world would require US$187 billion; US$71 billion for fuel cycle facilities; less than US$7 billion for all research reactors; and US$640 billion for dismantling all military reactors for the production of weapons-grade plutonium, research fuel facilities, nuclear reprocessing chemical separation facilities, etc. 
The total cost to decommission the nuclear fission industry in the World (from 2001 to 2050) was estimated at around US$1 trillion. Market Watch estimated (2019) the global decommissioning costs in the nuclear sector in the range of US$1 billion to US$1.5 billion per 1,000-megawatt plant.

The huge costs of research and development for (geological) longterm disposal of nuclear waste are collectively defrayed by the taxpayers in different countries, not by the companies.

Decommissioning funds 
The costs of decommissioning are to be covered by funds that are provided for in a decommissioning plan, which is part of the facility’s initial authorization, before the start of the operations. In this way, it is ensured that there will be sufficient money to pay for the eventual decommissioning of the facility. This may for example be through saving in a trust fund or a guarantee from the parent company

Switzerland has a central fund for decommissioning its five nuclear power reactors, and another one for disposal the nuclear waste. Germany has also a state-owned fund for decommissioning of the plants and managing radioactive waste, for which the reactor owners have to pay. The UK Government (the taxpayers) will pay most of the costs for both nuclear decommissioning and existing waste.
 The decommissioning of all Magnox reactors is entirely funded by the state.

Since 2010, owners of new nuclear plants in the Netherlands are obliged to set up a decommissioning fund before construction is started.

Underfunding 
The economic costs of decommissioning will increase as more
assets reach the end of their life, but few operators have put aside sufficient funds.

In 2016 the European Commission assessed that European Union's nuclear decommissioning liabilities were seriously underfunded by about 118 billion euros, with only 150 billion euros of earmarked assets to cover 268 billion euros of expected decommissioning costs covering both dismantling of nuclear plants and storage of radioactive parts and waste.

In Feb 2017, a committee of the French parliament warned that the state-controlled EDF has underestimated the costs for decommissioning. France had set aside only €23 billion for decommissioning and waste storage of its 58 reactors, which was less than a third of 74 billion in expected costs, while the UK's NDA estimated that clean-up of UK's 17 nuclear sites will cost between €109-€250 billion. EDF estimated the total cost at €54 billion. According to the parliamentary commission, the clean-up of French reactors will take longer, be more challenging and cost much more than EDF anticipates. It said that EDF showed "excessive optimism" concerning the decommissioning. EDF values some €350 million per reactor, whereas European operators count with between 900 million and 1.3 billion euros per reactor. The EDF's estimate was primarily based on the single historic example of the already dismantled Chooz A reactor. The committee argued that costs like restoration of the site, removal of spent fuel, taxes and insurance and social costs should be included.

Similar concerns about underfunding exist in the United States, where the U.S. Nuclear Regulatory Commission has located apparent decommissioning funding assurance shortfalls and requested 18 power plants to address that issue. The decommissioning cost of Small modular reactors is expected to be twice as much respect to Large Reactors.

Examples by country 
In France, decommissioning of Brennilis Nuclear Power Plant, a fairly small 70 MW power plant, already cost €480 million (20x the estimate costs) and is still pending after 20 years. 
Despite the huge investments in securing the dismantlement, radioactive elements such as plutonium, caesium-137 and cobalt-60 leaked out into the surrounding lake.

In the UK, the decommissioning of civil nuclear assets were estimated to be  £99 to £232 billion (2020), earlier in 2005 under-estimated to be £20-40 billion. The Sellafield site (Calder Hall, Windscale and the reprocessing facility) alone accounts for most of the decommissioning cost and increase in cost; 
as of 2015, the costs were estimated £53.2 billion. In 2019, the estimate was even much higher: £97 billion. A 2013 estimate by the United Kingdom's Nuclear Decommissioning Authority predicted costs of at least £100 billion to decommission the 19 existing United Kingdom nuclear sites.

In Germany, decommissioning of Niederaichbach nuclear power plant, a 100 MW power plant, amounted to more than €143 million.

Lithuania has increased the prognosis of decommissioning costs from €2019 million in 2010 to €3376 million in 2015.

United States 
The decommissioning can only be completed after the on-site storage of nuclear waste has been ended. Under the 1982 Nuclear Waste Policy Act, a "Nuclear Waste Fund", funded by tax on electricity was established to build a geologic repository. In May 2016, collection of the fee was suspended after a complaint by owners and operators of nuclear power plants. By 2021, the Fund had a balance of more than $44 billion, including interest. Later, the Fund has been put back into the general fund and is being used for other purposes. As the plan for the Yucca Mountain nuclear waste repository has been canceled, DOE announced in 2021 the establishing of  an interim repository for nuclear waste.

Because the government has failed to establish a central repository, the federal government pays about half-a-billion dollars a year to the utilities as penalty, to compensate the cost of storage at more than 80 ISFSI sites in 35 states as of 2021. As of 2021, the government had paid $9 billion to utility companies for their interim storage costs, which may grow to $31 billion or more.

Nuclear waste costed the American taxpayers through the Department of Energy (DOE) budget as of 2018 about $30 billion per year, $18 billion for  nuclear power and $12 billion for waste from nuclear weapons programs.

KPMG estimated the total cost of decommissioning the US nuclear fleet as of 2018 to be greater than US$150 billion. About two-thirds can be attributed to costs for termination of the NRC operating licence; 25% to management of spent fuel; and 10% to site restoration. The decommissioning of only the three uranium enrichment facilities would have an estimated cost (2004) of US$18.7 to 62 billion, with an additional US$2 to 6 billion for the dismantling of a large inventory of depleted uranium hexafluoride. The cost will exceed the revenues by billions.

International collaboration 
Organizations that promote the international sharing of information, knowledge, and experiences related to nuclear decommissioning include the International Atomic Energy Agency, the Organization for Economic Co-operation and Development's Nuclear Energy Agency and the European Atomic Energy Community. In addition, an online system called the Deactivation and Decommissioning Knowledge Management Information Tool was developed under the United States Department of Energy and made available to the international community to support the exchange of ideas and information. The goals of international collaboration in nuclear decommissioning are to reduce decommissioning costs and improve worker safety.

Decommissioning of ships, mobile reactors, and military reactors 

Many warships and a few civil ships have used nuclear reactors for propulsion. Former Soviet and American warships have been taken out of service and their power plants removed or scuttled. Dismantling of Russian submarines and ships and American submarines and ships is ongoing. Russia has a fleet of nuclear-powered vessels  in decommissioning, dumped in the Barents Sea. Estimated cost for the decommissioning of the two K-27 and K-159 submarines alone was €300 million (2019), or $330 million. Marine power plants are generally smaller than land-based electrical generating stations.

The biggest American military nuclear facility for the production of weapons-grade plutonium was Hanford site (in the State of Washington), now defueled, but in a slow and problematic process of decontamination, decommissioning, and demolition. There is "the canyon", a large structure for the chemical extraction of plutonium with the PUREX process. There are also many big containers and underground tanks with a solution of water, hydrocarbons and uranium-plutonium-neptunium-cesium-strontium (all highly radioactive). With all reactors now defueled, some were put in SAFSTOR (with their cooling towers demolished). Several reactors have been declared National Historic Landmarks.

List of inactive or decommissioned civil nuclear reactors
A wide range of nuclear facilities have been decommissioned so far. The number of decommissioned nuclear reactors out of the  List of nuclear reactors is small. As May 2022, about 700 nuclear reactors have been retired from operation in several early and intermediate stages (cold shut-down, defueling, SAFSTOR, internal demolition), but only about 25 have been taken to fully "greenfield status". Many of these sites still host spent nuclear fuel in the form of dry casks embedded in concrete filled steel drums.

As of 2017, most nuclear plants operating in the United States were designed for a life of about 30–40 years and are licensed to operate for 40 years by the US Nuclear Regulatory Commission. As of 2020, the average age of these reactors was about 39 years. Many plants are coming to the end of their licensing period and if their licenses are not renewed, they must go through a decontamination and decommissioning process.

Generally are not included the costs of storage of nuclear waste, including spent fuel, and maintenance of the storage facility, pending the realization of repository sites for long-term disposal,p.246 (in the US Independent Spent Fuel Storage Installations (ISFSI's). Thus many entities do not include the cost of managing spent nuclear fuel, removed from the plant areas that will be decommissioned. There are, however, large differences between countries regarding inclusion of certain costs, such as on-site storage of fuel and radioactive waste from decommissioning, dismanting of non-radioactive buildings and structures, and transport and (final) disposal of radioactive waste.,p.61
The year of costs may refer to the value corrected for exchange rates and inflation until that year (e.g. 2020-dollars).

The stated power in the list is preferably given in design net capacity (reference unit power) in MWe, similar to the List of commercial nuclear reactors.

United Kingdom

United States

See also
 Lists of nuclear disasters and radioactive incidents
 Marcoule Nuclear Site in France
 Nuclear Decommissioning Authority
 Nuclear entombment
 Ship-Submarine Recycling Program

References

External links 
 
 NUCLEAR ENERGY AGENCY of the Organisation for Economic Co-operation & Development: Cost of Decommissioning Nuclear Energy Plants (2016)
 UNITED STATES NUCLEAR REGULATORY COMMISSION: Backgrounder on Decommissioning Nuclear Power Plants
 Business Insider – UK: Getting Rid Of Old Nuclear Reactors Worldwide Is Going To Cost Way More Than People Think
 Germany's economy minister Sigmar Gabriel says state won't pay for nuclear decommissioning (May 18, 2014)
 Nuclear Decommissioning Report (www.ndreport.com) is the multi-media platform for the nuclear decommissioning industry.
 decommissioning.info is a portal with information on nuclear decommissioning
 US Sites Undergoing Decommissioning
 European website on decommissioning of nuclear installations
 Decommissioning Fund Methodologies for Nuclear Installations in the EU, rapport by the German Wuppertal Institute, commissioned by the European Commission. May 2007. 
 Master 'Nuclear Energy' – Decommissioning and Waste management 

Nuclear technology
Nuclear power stations
Radioactive waste
Nuclear liability
Radioactive contamination